Sakiko (written: ,  or ) is a feminine Japanese given name. Notable people with the name include:

, Japanese synchronized swimmer
, Japanese economist
, Japanese women's footballer
, Japanese singer and actress
Konoe Sakiko (近衛 前子, 1575-1630), Imperial consort to Emperor Go-Yozei
, Japanese idol and singer
, Japanese gymnast
, Japanese women's professional shogi player
, Japanese swimmer
, Japanese voice actress
Sakiko Yamaoka (born 1961), Japanese artist

See also
3983 Sakiko, a main-belt asteroid

Japanese feminine given names